John 1:15 is the fifteenth verse in the first chapter of the Gospel of John in the New Testament of the Christian Bible.

Content
In the original Greek according to Westcott-Hort, this verse is:
Ἰωάννης μαρτυρεῖ περὶ αὐτοῦ, καὶ κέκραγε λέγων, Οὗτος ἦν ὃν εἶπον, Ὁ ὀπίσω μου ἐρχόμενος ἔμπροσθέν μου γέγονεν· ὅτι πρῶτός μου ἦν.  

In the King James Version of the Bible the text reads:
John bare witness of him, and cried, saying, This was he of whom I spake, He that cometh after me is preferred before me: for he was before me.

The New International Version translates the passage as:
John testifies concerning him. He cries out, saying, "This was he of whom I said, 'He who comes after me has surpassed me because he was before me.'"

Analysis
The sense of "is preferred before me," according to Witham is, he who is greater in dignity, deserves greater honour, even though he was born after me, he was from eternity.

Commentary from the Church Fathers
Alcuin: "He had said before that there was a man sent to bear witness; now he gives definitely the forerunner’s own testimony, which plainly declared the excellence of His Human Nature and the Eternity of His Godhead. John bare witness of Him."

Theophylact of Ohrid: " He saith, Who cometh after me, that is, as to the time of His birth. John was six months before Christ, according to His humanity."

Chrysostom: "Or this does not refer to the birth from Mary; for Christ was born, when this was said by John; but to His coming for the work of preaching. He then saith, is madea before me; that is, is more illustrious, more honourable; as if he said, Do not suppose me greater than He, because I came first to preach."

Theophylact of Ohrid: "The Arians infer from this word1, that the Son of God is not begotten of the Father, but made like any other creature."

Augustine: "It does not mean—He was made before I was made; but He is preferred to me."

Chrysostom: "If the words, made before me, referred to His coming into being, it was superfluous to add, For He was before me. For who would be so foolish as not to know, that if He was made before him, He was before him. It would have been more correct to say, He was before me, because He was made before me. The expression then, He was made before me, must be taken in the sense of honour: only that which was to take place, he speaks of as having taken place already, after the style of the old Prophets, who commonly talk of the future as the past."

References

External links
Other translations of John 1:15 at BibleHub

01:15